WABX is a radio station in Evansville, Indiana, owned by Duey Wright, through licensee Midwest Communications, Inc. The station, which broadcasts at 107.5 FM, has aired a classic rock format since 1997.

Former WABX

From 1960 to 1984, WABX ("The station that glows in the dark") was the call sign of a widely influential freeform/progressive rock radio station in Detroit, Michigan.  In 1985, WABX's former consultant, Paul Christy, purchased WCFX/95.3 in Clare, Michigan, and subsequently parked the WABX calls on WCFX's sister station, 990 AM. WABX/990 ceased operations in 1988. The current 107.5 WABX logo is substantially similar to the Detroit WABX logo used during that station's 1970s' heyday. The former Detroit WABX now broadcasts a country format as WYCD.

Sale to Midwest Communications
It was announced on May 28, 2014, that Midwest Communications will purchase 9 of the 10 stations owned by South Central Communications. (This includes the Evansville Cluster which include WABX along with sister stations WIKY-FM, WLFW & WSTO.) With this purchase, Midwest Communications will expand its portfolio of stations to Evansville, Knoxville and Nashville. The sale was finalized on September 2, 2014, at a price of $72 million.

References

External links
Official Website

ABX
Classic rock radio stations in the United States
Midwest Communications radio stations